Paul Andreas Pedersen (18 September 1886 – 16 August 1948) was a Norwegian gymnast who competed in the 1908 and 1912 Summer Olympics.

As a member of the Norwegian team, he won a silver medal in the gymnastics team event in 1908. Four years later he was part of the Norwegian team, which won the bronze medal in the gymnastics team, Swedish system event. He was born in Fredrikshald and died in Idd, and represented the club Fredrikshalds TF.

References

1886 births
1948 deaths
Norwegian male artistic gymnasts
Olympic gymnasts of Norway
Olympic silver medalists for Norway
Olympic bronze medalists for Norway
Olympic medalists in gymnastics
Medalists at the 1908 Summer Olympics
Medalists at the 1912 Summer Olympics
Gymnasts at the 1908 Summer Olympics
Gymnasts at the 1912 Summer Olympics
People from Halden
Sportspeople from Viken (county)
20th-century Norwegian people